Amedeo Tommasi (1 December 1935 – 13 April 2021) was an Italian pianist and composer. He specialized in the composition of music for films.

Biography
Tommasi started his career as a trombonist for a jazz band in Bologna. He gained notoriety in Italy for his performances on the radio show La coppa di jazz in 1960. The following year, he performed in the Sanremo Music Festival and received the First Prize at the Festival Bled in Slovenia. In the years following, he made recordings with Chet Baker, Bobby Jaspar, René Thomas, Buddy Collette, Conte Candoli, and Jacques Pelzer. In the early 1970s, he began composing music for films. In the film The Legend of 1900, he composed each of the recordings and also had a cameo appearance as a pianist. He also appeared in the 2010 documentary Pupi Avati, ieri oggi domani, directed by Claudio Costa.

Amedeo Tommasi died in Rome on 13 April 2021 at the age of 85.

Filmography
Long Days of Hate (1968)
 (1970)
Balsamus, l'uomo di Satana (1970)
La mazurka del barone, della santa e del fico fiorone (1975)
Le seminariste (1976)
The House with Laughing Windows (1976)
House of Pleasure for Women (1976)
Tutti defunti... tranne i morti (1977)
Le strelle nel fosso (1979)
An American Love (1994)
Sleepless (2001)

References

Italian jazz pianists
Male film score composers
2021 deaths
1935 births
People from Trieste